Jean Borotra and Jacques Brugnon were the defending champions but they split up and Borotra teamed up with René Lacoste and Brugnon partnered with Henri Cochet. The final saw the encounter of these teams known all together as the Four Musketeers with the former pair clinching the title.

Seeds
Every but 16 teams (neither the third and four seeds) received a bye into the second round.

Draw

Finals

Top half

Section 1

Section 2

Bottom half

Section 3

Section 4

Sources
Béla Kehrling, ed. (10 June 1929). "A férfi páros mezőnye [The doubles draw]" (in Hungarian) (pdf). Tennisz és Golf. I (Budapest, Hungary: Bethlen Gábor Irod. és Nyomdai RT) 3: 67. Retrieved September 22, 2012.

1929
1929 in French tennis